Gino the Chicken (Gino il pollo), also known as Gino the Chicken lost in the net,  is an Italian television series.It was initially an Internet meme created by Andrea Zingoni, here became an animated series produced by My-Tv and RAI.

Plot
The famous singing chicken Gino, kidnapped by Vito, is taken to the top-secret facilities of the Alamo Lab, where he is used, against his will, as the guinea-pig for a mad experiment carried out by Chief Wino: the dematerialisation of a living being inside internet. If the experiment with the chicken works, then it will be the turn of the entire human race to be dematerialised, and Chief Colby will become the all-powerful sovereign of the Web. Gino though, manages to escape from Colby's grasp and, reduced to a pile of digital dust, flees into the endless maze of the Web. All alone lost in the Web, Gino arrives in Libertatia, where he makes friends with the X-Animals, mutant beings discarded in the course of bio-electronic evolution, and falls madly in love with the glamorous female chick Gina.

Episodes

See also
List of Italian television series
Internet memes

External links
 

2006 Italian television series debuts
2006 Italian television series endings
Italian children's animated television series
Internet memes
Film and television memes
Television series about chickens
RAI original programming